Flatland is an 1884 novella by Edwin Abbott.

Flatland or Flatlands may also refer to:

Geography
 Flatlands, Brooklyn, a neighborhood in Brooklyn, New York
Flatlands, New Brunswick, a community in New Brunswick, Canada

Arts, entertainment, and media
 Flatland (2007 film), a full-length computer animated film based on the novella 
 Flatland: The Movie, a 2007 animated short film based on the novella, separate from the full-length film
 Flatland (2019 film), a 2019 South African film
 Flatland, an online magazine published by KCPT

Sports
 Flatland BMX, a practitioner of BMX freestyle focusing on stunts performed exclusively on the ground 
 Flatland skimboarding, a watersport commonly done in creeks, lakes, or rivers
 Freestyle skating, also known as flatland in-line skating

See also 
 Flatlander (disambiguation)